Airi Mikkelä (born 5 April 1993) is a Finnish badminton player. She started playing badminton at 8 years old, then in 2009, she joined Finnish national badminton team. In 2010, she participated at the 2010 Summer Youth Olympics in Singapore. In 2014, she won Iceland International tournament in women's singles event. In 2015, she became the runner-up of Mauritius and Mexico international tournament. In 2016, she won Peru International Series and became the runner-up of Iceland International tournament.

Achievements

BWF Grand Prix 
The BWF Grand Prix had two levels, the Grand Prix and Grand Prix Gold. It was a series of badminton tournaments sanctioned by the Badminton World Federation (BWF) and played between 2007 and 2017.

Women's singles

  BWF Grand Prix Gold tournament
  BWF Grand Prix tournament

BWF International Challenge/Series 
Women's singles

Women's doubles

  BWF International Challenge tournament
  BWF International Series tournament
  BWF Future Series tournament

References

External links 
 

1993 births
Living people
Sportspeople from Vantaa
Finnish female badminton players
Badminton players at the 2010 Summer Youth Olympics
Badminton players at the 2015 European Games
Badminton players at the 2019 European Games
European Games competitors for Finland